Shaji Neelakantan Karun (born 1 January 1952) is an Indian film director and cinematographer. His debut film Piravi (1988) won the Caméra d'Or – Mention d'honneur at the 1989 Cannes Film Festival. He was the premiere chairman of the Kerala State Chalachitra Academy, the first academy for film and TV in India and was also the executive chairman of the International Film Festival of Kerala (IFFK) from 1998 to 2001. He is best known for his award-winning films Piravi (1988), Swaham (1994), Vanaprastham (1999) and Kutty Srank (2009). He won the National Award for Best Director for his debut film Piravi. He also won two Kerala State Film Awards for Best Director for his films Swaham and Vanaprastham. Currently, he is the Chairman of Kerala State Film Development Corporation.

Biography
Shaji N. Karun was born on New Year's Day, 1952, as the eldest son of Mr. N. Karunakaran and Mrs. Chandramati in present-day Kollam district in the former state of Travancore state (now Kerala), India. The family moved to Thiruvananthapuram, the capital of the state in 1963. He did his schooling in Palkulangara H.S. and took a bachelor's degree from University College, Thiruvananthapuram. In 1971 he entered the Film and Television Institute of India, where he took his diploma in cinematography. His diploma film Genesis (1974), directed by Rahul Dasgupta, got many awards and started his career. He won the GOLD medal on graduation in 1974. After graduation, he worked in ISRO Ahmedabad, Mumbai TV, Madras Film Industry on contract basis until 1975 when Kerala State Film Development Corporation (KSFDC)  was about to realize. He became responsible with founder Chairman P R S Pillai, and its then Managing Director G.Vivekanandan for the planning, designing future visions of KSFDC to bring back the Film Industry that was until then rooted in Madras. His role with the participation in meaningful cinema activities through the contribution of KSFDC and well-known giants in Malayalam filmmakers resulted in many landmark achievements to the Malayalam Cinema nationally and Internationally. 
1998, He started and presided the first film academy in India as Kerala State Chalachitra Academy under Government of Kerala and leadership of then Cultural Minister Marxist Late Shri T K Ramakrshnan. It is in the same year he started the International Film Festival (IFFK) as competitive and further FIAPF recognized the festival as International competitive under his tenure. He has presented three films- Piravi, Swaham, Vanaprastham consecutively to Cannes official sections, a rare achievement for any filmmakers worldwide,  where the film Swaham was in competition of Cannes in 1994. Since then, until now, no films from INDIA selected to compete for Cannes' Palme d'Or. He is the Only Malayalam filmmaker who achieved three national best films (Piravi, Vanaprastham, Kuttysrank) for the Malayalam language.

Personal life
Shaji married Anasuya Warrier,  daughter of Dr. P. K. R. Warrier, who was his neighbor in Trivandrum for quite some time, on 1 January 1975. After a brief stint in the south Indian city of Madras, he returned to Thiruvananthapuram in 1976 where he got an appointment as film officer in the newly formed state Film Development Corporation. They have 2 sons, Anil and Appu. His association with the legendary Malayalam filmmaker G. Aravindan began at this time. Then he continued working with notable directors like G. Aravindan, K. G. George and M. T. Vasudevan Nair as a cinematographer. His career also spreads to many activities by Government of India and Kerala where he served in the capacities of advisory status on policy decisions. 20th International film festival of Kerala conducted by the government of Kerala, in 2015 December 4–11, under his advisory capacity is marked by the Press and film lovers as the best of the festivals held so far. Aug 2018, he is selected for the position of 8th President of Purogamana Kala Sahitya Sangham (Progressive Arts & Literary Organization) an Association for Art and Letters. On 31 May 2019, the government of Kerala has appointed him as the Chairman of Kerala State Film Development Corporation and assumed the position from 17 June 2019.
personal website www.shajinkarun.com

Career in film direction 

Shaji made his directorial debut with the Malayalam film Piravi ("The Birth", 1988), which won him the prestigious Caméra d'Or – Mention d'honneur at the 1989 Cannes Film Festival. While Piravi was about the grief of a father who loses his son, Shaji's second film, Swaham (1994) continued with the theme of grief. Swaham was selected to compete at the 1994 Cannes Film Festival. Vaanaprastham ("The Final Dance", 1999) dealt with the identity crisis faced by an actor. Mohanlal played the lead role in this film. He directed the film Nishad, made in Hindi, which was completed in May 2002, and premiered in the Fukuoka International Film Festival held in September 2002 in Japan.  His latest film is titled Kutty Srank with Mammootty playing the lead role. The film was released theatrically in Kerala in July 2010.Swapaanam with Jayaram and Kadambari has premiered at Dubai International Film Festival on 8 December 2013, a rare recognition for Malayalam Cinema as the World premiere screening outside India. Olu, his latest film, under 'fantasy perception' and narrative, had chosen the inaugural film of Indian Panorama film selections presented in International Film Festival of India Goa-2018. OLU has also been chosen as the "OPENING FILMS" of TWO major International film festivals- International film festival of INNSBRUCK 2019.AUSTRIA, ISOLA Cinema International film festival 2019, SLOVENIA. Olu also won the National Film Award for Best Cinematography (2018) award in the 66th National Film Awards.

He has also made around a dozen short films and documentaries. Besides making films, Shaji Karun has been active as a juror at many international film festivals and an active participant in governmental and academic arenas. He was the Premiere Chairman of the Kerala State Chalachitra Academy, the first academy for film and TV in India and was also the Executive Chairman of International Film Festival of Kerala from 1998 to 2001.

Upcoming projects 
As of January 2018 Shaji is completing the post-production of a new movie titled Olu with Shane Nigam and Esther Anil playing the lead roles. In a recent interview, Shaji revealed that Olu is the tale of a girl who gets gang raped and sunk to the bottom of the backwaters where she can mysteriously survive and live for the next nine months -until she delivers her ‘baby from rape’. The film will attempt to convey her perception of innocent feminine desires – spiritual and transcendental feelings."

His project Gaadha was announced in September 2012. Though was expected to commence shooting by November 2014, it has been postponed until further notice. Music was to be composed by the Polish composer Zbigniew Preisner.

In May 2022 Shaji N Karun announced his next project based on the life of Amrita Sher-Gil, pioneer of Indian modern art. In an interview with Jisha Surya of News9Live The cinematographer-director said that the multilingual movie will be based on the biographical writings of Sher-Gil. Conceived as an Indo-French-US collaborative project, the movie will have international actors and technicians. Karun has approached a Mexican actor to play the lead role of the Hungarian-Indian painter.

Awards and milestones

National and international honors
 Life Time Achievement Award- 12th Jaipur International Film Festival INDIA-2020
 Life Time Achievement- Tyrol : IFFI Prize (2014) Innsbruck Film Festival, AUSTRIA 
 Padma Shri in 2011 INDIA
 Ordre des Arts et des Lettres (1999) FRANCE
 The first Sir Charles Chaplin Award to commemorate the centenary of Chaplin's birth (1989) Edinburgh International Film Festival, UK

As a cinematographer
 Eastman Kodak Award for Excellence, Hawaii International Film Festival (1989)
 National Film Award: Thampu (Circus Tent) (1979)
 Awards from the Government of Kerala: Kanchana Sita (1977), Esthappan (1981), Onnumuthal Poojayam Vare (1986)

As a director
 Cannes Film Festival, nominated for Palme d'Or (Best Film): Swaham (1994)
 Cannes Film Festival, Caméra d'Or (Special Mention): Piravi (1989)
 London Film Festival, Outstanding Film: Piravi (1989)
 Locarno International Film Festival, Grand Jury Prize (Silver Leopard): Piravi (1989)
 Hawaii International Film Festival , Best film Piravi (1989)
 Chicago International Film Festival , USA, Silver Hugo 
 Fajr Film Festival. Iran Crystal Simorgh
 Bergamo Film Meeting , Italy Rosa Camuna 1990
 International Film Festival Innsbruck iffi.at, Austria Best Film 1995
 Bergamo Film Meeting , Italy Bronze Rosa Camuna 1995
 1999 Cannes Film Festival: Vanaprastham was screened in the Un Certain Regard section of the festival (1999)
 Mumbai International Film Festival , FEPRISCI Prize, 1999
 International Istanbul Film Festival, Grand Jury Prize: Vanaprastham (2000)

National Film Awards:

 2009 – Best Film – Kutty Srank
 1999 – Best Film – Vanaprastham
 1997 – Best Non-Feature Film – Sham's Vision (English)
 1994 – Special Jury Award – Swaham
 1988 – Best Film – (Producer) Piravi
 1988 – Best Director – Piravi
 1979 – Best Cinematographer (Black & White) – Thampu

Kerala State Film Awards:

 1999 – Best Director – Vanaprastham
 1994 – Second Best Film – Swaham
 1994 – Best Director – Swaham
 1988 – Second Best Film – Piravi
 1986 – Best Cinematographer – Onnu Muthal Poojyam Vare
 1979 – Best Cinematographer – Esthappan
 1977 – Best Cinematographer – Kanchana Sita

Filmfare Awards Souths:

 1989: Filmfare Award for Best Director – Malayalam – Piravi

Filmography as director
 Amrita (2022 Under development)
 Oolu (2018)
 Swapaanam (2013)
 Kutty Shranku (2009)
 Nishad (2002)    
 Vanaprastham  (1999)
 Swaham        (1994)
 Piravi        (1988)

Short films
 Wild Life of Kerala  (1979)
 Kerala Carnival (1980)
 Kannikal (1986)
 Sham's Vision (1996)
 Bhavam (1998)
 G. Aravindan (2000)
 Big Man & Small World (2002)
 Yathrakkidayil (2004)
 Moving Focus-A Voyage with K G Subramanyan (2006)
 AKG (2007)
 "Fine Balance" (2010)
 "Waiting" (2011)
 Signature film- INTERNATIONAL FILM FESTIVAL OF INDIA (2012)
 "Artist Namboodiri-'NERUVARA'/'trueline' " (2015)

As a cinematographer
 Genesis (1974)
 Lakshmi Vijayam (1976)
 Njavalppazhangal (1976)
 Kanchana Sita (1977)
 Muhoorthangal (1977)
 Thampu (1978)
 Kanchana Sita (1978)
 Kummatty (1979)
 Esthappan (1979)
 Pokkuveyil (1981)
 Enikku Vishakunnu (1982)
 Koodevide (1983)
 Manju (1983)
 Lekhayude Maranam Oru Flashback (1983)
 Mangalam Nerunnu (1984)
 Panchavadi Palam (1984)
 Chidambaram (1985)
 Meenamasathile Sooryan (1985)
 Principal Olivil (1985)
 Nakhakshathangal (1986)
 Arappatta Kettiya Gramathil (1986)
 Ek Chadar Maili Si (1986)
 Neram Pularumbol (1986)
 Meenamasathile Sooryan (1986)
 Onnu Muthal Poojyam Vare (1986)
 Panchagni (1986)
 Oridathu (1987)
 Marattam (1988)
 Unni (1989)
 Antim Nyay (1993)
 Sargam (1992)

References

External links

 
 Shaji N. Karun is Pukasa president    
 https://www.news9live.com/art-culture/cinema/news9-exclusive-filmmaker-shaji-n-karun-announces-biopic-on-amrita-sher-gil-170310?infinitescroll=1

Cinematographers from Kerala
Malayalam film directors
Living people
Film and Television Institute of India alumni
Kerala State Film Award winners
1952 births
Film directors from Thiruvananthapuram
Chevaliers of the Ordre des Arts et des Lettres
Recipients of the Padma Shri in arts
Malayalam film cinematographers
Indian documentary filmmakers
Best Director National Film Award winners
Best Cinematography National Film Award winners
Artists from Kollam
20th-century Indian film directors
21st-century Indian film directors
20th-century Indian photographers
Malayalam film producers
Film producers from Thiruvananthapuram
Special Jury Award (feature film) National Film Award winners
Directors who won the Best Feature Film National Film Award